Nergüin Tümennast (1 January 1967 – 12 June 2021) was a Mongolian wrestler. He competed in the men's freestyle 82 kg at the 1992 Summer Olympics. He died on 12 June 2021, at the age of 54.

References

External links
 

1967 births
2021 deaths
Mongolian male sport wrestlers
Olympic wrestlers of Mongolia
Wrestlers at the 1992 Summer Olympics
Wrestlers at the 1994 Asian Games
Asian Games competitors for Mongolia
People from Övörkhangai Province
20th-century Mongolian people
21st-century Mongolian people